The Senate Armed Services Subcommittee on Airland is one of seven subcommittees within the Senate Armed Services Committee.

Jurisdiction

The Airland Subcommittee has primary jurisdiction over all issues related to the U.S. Army, U.S. Air Force, and U.S. Navy and Marine Corps tactical aviation programs; however, it does not include strategic forces, strategic airlift issues, and special operations programs. The subcommittee also oversees the Army and Air Force Reserves, and the National Guard.

Members, 118th Congress

Historical subcommittee rosters

117th Congress

116th Congress

115th Congress

See also
 United States House Armed Services Subcommittee on Air and Land Forces

References

External links
Senate Armed Services Committee home page
Senate Armed Services Committee subcommittee list and membership page

Armed Services Airland